National Highway 135BB, commonly referred to as NH 135BB is a national highway in India. It is a spur road of National Highway 35.  NH-135BB traverses the states of Madhya Pradesh and Uttar Pradesh in India.

Route 
Uttar Pradesh
Bargarh More near Jamira - Bargarh - Gahur - M.P. border.

Madhya Pradesh
U.P. border - Dubi, Magdaur, Dabhoura.

Junctions  

  Terminal near Jamira.
  Terminal near Dabhoura.

See also 
 List of National Highways in India
 List of National Highways in India by state

References

External links 

 NH 135BB on OpenStreetMap

National highways in India
National Highways in Madhya Pradesh
National Highways in Uttar Pradesh